Racheal Ajibola Olalere, popularly known as Tierny Olalere is a Nigerian movie actress, writer and producer.

Background and education 
Olalere is from a Christian family of 5 children and parents were police officers. She had her university education in Oyo State. She attended Ladoke Akintola University of Technology where she earned a bachelor’s degree in Agricultural and environmental science.

Career 
Olalere is a movie actress, writer and producer. She has taken part as cast and/or crew in Nollywood movies including Knock Knock, Mystic Birth, Isemi, Yellow, Alagogo Ide, Mariam, Pajuda, ‘Mason and Meredith’, Olawura. She began acting as a kid on stage in her local church. In an interview with The Guardian, she explained that starting her career, one of the biggest challenges she faced was with funding as well as her lack of familiarity with the administrative organization in the movie industry. She also iterated that she enjoys the support of both her parents in her chosen career path, although her mother was skeptical at first because it is a different field from what she studied in the university.

Filmography 
 Knock Knock
 Mystic Birth
 Isemi
 Yellow
 Alagogo Ide
 Mariam
 Pajuda
 Mason and Meredith
 Olawura (alongside Jide Awobona, as a producer)

References

External links 
 

Nigerian actresses
Yoruba filmmakers
Living people
Yoruba actresses
21st-century Nigerian actresses
Nigerian film actresses
Nigerian television actresses
Actresses in Yoruba cinema
Nigerian film producers
Nigerian film directors
Nigerian media personalities
Nigerian television personalities